Motor Trader Online is a motoring guide in Malaysia. Started in 1998, the magazine is published by PROTO Malaysia Sdn. Bhd.

Motor Trader Magazine's website lists over 41,000 cars, both new and used, in Malaysia.

Motor Trader Online was started by  Sir John Madejski in 1998. In 2011, Madejski sold the magazine and company to the Japanese conglomerate, PROTO Corporation. T

Motor Trader Magazine won Advertising & Marketing's Motor Vehicle Magazine of the Year in 2011 and 2013. The Motor Trader website was described as "one of the most popular review and classified sites" in the automotive category in Malaysia by Marketing Magazine based on the results of a study made by Effective Measure, the market research analysts for online media in September 2013.

Since 2012, Motor Trader has been the content provider for the Yahoo! Malaysia Autos page.

References

External links

Used Car for sale

1998 establishments in Malaysia
Automobile magazines
Automotive websites
Magazines established in 1998
Magazines published in Malaysia
Weekly magazines
English-language magazines